Kim Sanders is an Australian musician and composer. His album You Can't Get There From Here was nominated for 2002 ARIA Award for Best World Music Album.
 
Sanders was a member of multiple bands such an Tansey's Fancy (with Linsey Pollak, Mara Kiek, Llew Kiek and Doug Kelly),  Nakisa (with Llew Kiek, Davood Tabrizi, Linda Marr, Tony Lewis and Sabahattin Akdagcik), GengGong (with Sawung Jabo), Trio Dingo (with Blair Greenberg and Ron Reeves) and Kim Sanders & Friends (With friends including Sandy Evans, Bobby Singh, James Greening,  Sam Golding, Steve Elphick, Mark Szeto, Peter Kennard, Mustafa Karami, Ron Reeves, Toby Hall, Llew Kiek and Linda Marr).

Discography

Albums

Awards and nominations

ARIA Music Awards
The ARIA Music Awards is an annual awards ceremony that recognises excellence, innovation, and achievement across all genres of Australian music. They commenced in 1987.

! 
|-
| 2002
| You Can't Get There From Here
| ARIA Award for Best World Music Album
| 
| 
|-

References

External links
Kim Sanders World Music

Australian musicians
1948 births
2013 deaths